Bougara is a district in Blida Province, Algeria. It was named after its capital, Bougara.

Municipalities
The district is further divided into 3 municipalities:
Bougara
Hammam Melouane 
Ouled Selama

Districts of Blida Province